Ian Russell McEwan,  (born 21 June 1948) is an English novelist and screenwriter. In 2008, The Times featured him on its list of "The 50 greatest British writers since 1945" and The Daily Telegraph ranked him number 19 in its list of the "100 most powerful people in British culture".

McEwan began his career writing sparse, Gothic short stories. His first two novels, The Cement Garden (1978) and The Comfort of Strangers (1981), earned him the nickname "Ian Macabre". These were followed by three novels of some success in the 1980s and early 1990s. His novel Enduring Love was adapted into a film of the same name. He won the Booker Prize with Amsterdam (1998). His next novel, Atonement, garnered acclaim and was adapted into an Oscar-winning film featuring Keira Knightley and James McAvoy. His later novels have included The Children Act, Nutshell, and Machines Like Me. He was awarded the 1999 Shakespeare Prize, and the 2011 Jerusalem Prize.

Early life
McEwan was born in Aldershot, Hampshire, on 21 June 1948, the son of David McEwan and Rose Lilian Violet (née Moore). His father was a working-class Scotsman who had worked his way up through the army to the rank of major.

McEwan spent much of his childhood in East Asia (including Singapore), Germany, and north Africa (including Libya), where his father was posted. His family returned to England when he was 12 years old. He was educated at Woolverstone Hall School in Suffolk; the University of Sussex, where he received a degree in English literature in 1970; and the University of East Anglia, where he undertook a master's degree in literature (with the option to submit creative writing instead of a critical dissertation).

Career

Early career: short stories and 'Ian Macabre' phase, 1975–1987 
McEwan's first published work was a collection of short stories, First Love, Last Rites (1975), which won the Somerset Maugham Award in 1976. He achieved notoriety in 1979 when the BBC suspended production of his play Solid Geometry because of its supposed obscenity. His second collection of short stories, In Between the Sheets, was published in 1978. The Cement Garden (1978) and The Comfort of Strangers (1981), his two earliest novels, were both adapted into films. The nature of these works caused him to be nicknamed "Ian Macabre". These were followed by his first book for children, Rose Blanche (1985), and a return to literary fiction with The Child in Time (1987), winner of the 1987 Whitbread Novel Award.

Mid-career: mainstream success and Booker Prize win, 1988–2007 
After The Child in Time, McEwan began to move away from the darker, more unsettling material of his earlier career and towards the style that would see him reach a wider readership and gain significant critical acclaim. This new phase began with the publication of the mid-Cold War espionage drama The Innocent (1990), and Black Dogs (1992), a quasi-companion piece reflecting on the aftermath of the Nazi era in Europe and the end of the Cold War. McEwan followed these works with his second book for children, The Daydreamer (1994).

His 1997 novel, Enduring Love, about the relationship between a science writer and a stalker, was popular with critics, although it was not shortlisted for the Booker Prize. It was adapted into a film in 2004. In 1998, he won the Booker Prize for Amsterdam. His next novel, Atonement (2001), received considerable acclaim; Time magazine named it the best novel of 2002, and it was shortlisted for the Booker Prize. In 2007, the critically acclaimed film Atonement, directed by Joe Wright and starring Keira Knightley and James McAvoy, was released in cinemas worldwide. His next work, Saturday (2005), follows an especially eventful day in the life of a successful neurosurgeon. Saturday won the James Tait Black Memorial Prize for 2005. His novel On Chesil Beach (2007) was shortlisted for the 2007 Man Booker Prize and was adapted into a film starring Saoirse Ronan in 2017, for which McEwan wrote the screenplay. McEwan has also written a number of produced screenplays, a stage play, children's fiction, and an oratorio and a libretto titled For You with music composed by Michael Berkeley.

In 2006, McEwan was accused of plagiarism; specifically that a passage in Atonement (2001) closely echoed a passage from a memoir, No Time for Romance, published in 1977 by Lucilla Andrews. McEwan acknowledged using the book as a source for his work. McEwan had included a brief note at the end of Atonement, referring to Andrews's autobiography, among several other works. The incident recalled critical controversy over his debut novel The Cement Garden, key elements of the plot of which closely mirrored some of those of Our Mother's House, a 1963 novel by British author Julian Gloag, which had also been made into a film. McEwan denied charges of plagiarism, claiming he was unaware of the earlier work. Writing in The Guardian in November 2006, a month after Andrews' death, McEwan professed innocence of plagiarism while acknowledging his debt to the author of No Time for Romance. Several authors defended him, including John Updike, Martin Amis, Margaret Atwood, Thomas Keneally, Kazuo Ishiguro, Zadie Smith, and Thomas Pynchon.

Later career: political works and continued success, 2008–present 
McEwan's first novel of the 2010s, Solar, was published by Jonathan Cape and Doubleday in March 2010. In June 2008 at the Hay Festival, McEwan gave a surprise reading of this work-in-progress. The novel includes "a scientist who hopes to save the planet" from the threat of climate change, with inspiration for the novel coming from a Cape Farewell expedition McEwan made in 2005 in which "artists and scientists...spent several weeks aboard a ship near the north pole discussing environmental concerns". McEwan noted "The novel's protagonist Michael Beard has been awarded a Nobel prize for his pioneering work on physics, and has discovered that winning the coveted prize has interfered with his work". He said that the work was not a comedy: "I hate comic novels; it's like being wrestled to the ground and being tickled, being forced to laugh", instead, that it had extended comic stretches.

Solar was followed by McEwan's twelfth novel, Sweet Tooth, a meta-fictional historical novel set in the 1970s, and was published in late August 2012. In an interview with The Scotsman newspaper to coincide with publication, McEwan revealed that the impetus for writing Sweet Tooth had been "[...] a way in which I can write a disguised autobiography". He revealed in an interview with The Wall Street Journal, in November 2012, that the film rights to Sweet Tooth had been bought by Working Title Films – the company that had adapted Atonement as a film. Sweet Tooth was followed two years later by The Children Act, which concerned High Court judges, UK family law, and the right to die.

Two years after The Children Act, McEwan's 2016 novel Nutshell, a short novel closer in style and tone to his earlier works, was published. McEwan's next work, a short novella, was titled My Purple Scented Novel – part of which was published previously as a short story by the same title in The New Yorker in 2016. This short work was published to mark McEwan's 70th birthday in June 2018.

McEwan followed Nutshell in April 2019 with the alternate history/science fiction novel Machines Like Me. It concerns artificial intelligence and an alternate history in which Great Britain loses the Falklands War and the Labour Party, led by Tony Benn, eventually wins the 1987 General Election. In September 2019, McEwan announced a quick surprise follow-up novella, The Cockroach.

Awards and honours
McEwan has been nominated for the Booker Prize six times to date, winning the prize for Amsterdam in 1998. His other nominations were for The Comfort of Strangers (1981, shortlisted), Black Dogs (1992, shortlisted), Atonement (2001, shortlisted), Saturday (2005, longlisted), and On Chesil Beach (2007, shortlisted). McEwan also received nominations for the International Booker  Prize in 2005 and 2007.

He is a Fellow of the Royal Society of Literature, a Fellow of the Royal Society of Arts, and a Fellow of the American Academy of Arts and Sciences. He was awarded the Shakespeare Prize by the Alfred Toepfer Foundation, Hamburg, in 1999. He is also a Distinguished Supporter of Humanists UK. He was appointed Commander of the Order of the British Empire (CBE) in the 2000 New Year Honours for services to literature. In 2005, he was the first recipient of Dickinson College's Harold and Ethel L. Stellfox Visiting Scholar and Writers Program Award, in Carlisle, Pennsylvania. In 2008, McEwan was awarded the honorary degree of Doctor of Literature by University College London, where he had previously taught English literature.

In 2006, the Board of Trustees of the Kenyon Review honored McEwan with the Kenyon Review Award for Literary Achievement, writing that "McEwan's stories, novels, and plays are notable for their fierce artistic dramas, exploring unanticipated and often brutal collisions between the ordinary and the extraordinary".

In 2008, The Times named McEwan among their list of "The 50 greatest British writers since 1945".

In 2010, McEwan received the Peggy V. Helmerich Distinguished Author Award. The Helmerich Award is presented annually by the Tulsa Library Trust.

On 20 February 2011, he was awarded the Jerusalem Prize for the Freedom of the Individual in Society. He accepted the prize, despite controversy and pressure from groups and individuals opposed to the Israeli government. McEwan responded to his critics, and specifically the group British Writers in Support of Palestine (BWISP), in a letter to The Guardian, stating in part, "There are ways in which art can have a longer reach than politics, and for me the emblem in this respect is Daniel Barenboim's West-Eastern Divan Orchestra – surely a beam of hope in a dark landscape, though denigrated by the Israeli religious right and Hamas. If BWISP is against this particular project, then clearly we have nothing more to say to each other". McEwan's acceptance speech discussed the complaints against him and provided further insight into his reasons for accepting the award. He also said he will donate the amount of the prize, "ten thousand dollars to Combatants for Peace, an organisation that brings together Israeli ex-soldiers and Palestinian ex-fighters".

In 2012, the University of Sussex presented McEwan with its 50th Anniversary Gold Medal in recognition of his contributions to literature.

In 2014, the Harry Ransom Center at the University of Texas paid $2 million for McEwan's literary archives. The archives includes drafts of all of his later novels. McEwan commented that his novel Atonement started out as a science fiction story set "two or three centuries in the future".

In 2019, McEwan received the Golden Plate Award of the American Academy of Achievement.

In 2020, McEwan was awarded the Goethe Medal, a yearly prize given by the Goethe-Institut honouring non-Germans "who have performed outstanding service for the German language and for international cultural relations". According to the jury, McEwan's literary work ("Machines like us") is "imbued with the essence of contradiction and critical, depth-psychological reflection of social phenomena". Despite harsh attacks in his own country, the writer "openly defends himself against narrow-minded nationalisms" and appears as a passionate pro-European.

Views on religion and politics

In 2008, McEwan publicly spoke out against Islamism for its views on women and on homosexuality. He was quoted as saying that fundamentalist Islam wanted to create a society that he "abhorred". His comments appeared in the Italian newspaper Corriere della Sera, to defend fellow writer Martin Amis against allegations of racism. McEwan, an atheist, said that certain streams of Christianity were "equally absurd" and that he didn't "like these medieval visions of the world according to which God is coming to save the faithful and to damn the others".

McEwan put forward the following statement on his official site and blog after claiming he was misinterpreted:
Certain remarks of mine to an Italian journalist have been widely misrepresented in the UK press, and on various websites. Contrary to reports, my remarks were not about Islam, but about Islamism – perhaps 'extremism' would be a better term. I grew up in a Muslim country – Libya – and have only warm memories of a dignified, tolerant and hospitable Islamic culture. I was referring in my interview to a tiny minority who preach violent jihad, who incite hatred and violence against 'infidels', apostates, Jews and homosexuals; who in their speeches and on their websites speak passionately against free thought, pluralism, democracy, unveiled women; who will tolerate no other interpretation of Islam but their own and have vilified Sufism and other strands of Islam as apostasy; who have murdered, among others, fellow Muslims by the thousands in the market places of Iraq, Algeria and in the Sudan. Countless Islamic writers, journalists and religious authorities have expressed their disgust at this extremist violence. To speak against such things is hardly 'astonishing' on my part (Independent on Sunday) or original, nor is it 'Islamophobic' and 'right wing' as one official of the Muslim Council of Britain insists, and nor is it to endorse the failures and brutalities of US foreign policy. It is merely to invoke a common humanity which I hope would be shared by all religions as well as all non-believers.'

In 2007, Christopher Hitchens dedicated his book God Is Not Great to McEwan.

In 2008, McEwan was among more than 200,000 signatories of a petition to support Italian journalist Roberto Saviano who received multiple death threats and was placed in police protection after exposing the Mafia-like crime syndicate, Camorra, in his 2006 book Gomorrah. McEwan said he hoped the petition would help "galvanize" the Italian police into taking seriously the "fundamental matter of civil rights and free speech".

McEwan also signed a petition to support the release of Sakineh Mohammadi Ashtiani, an Iranian woman sentenced to death by stoning after being convicted of committing adultery.

On winning the Jerusalem Prize, McEwan defended himself against criticism for accepting the prize in light of opposition to Israeli policies, saying: "If you didn't go to countries whose foreign policy or domestic policy is screwed up, you'd never get out of bed". On accepting the honour he spoke in favour of Israel's existence, security, and freedoms, while strongly attacking Hamas, Israel's policies in Gaza, and the expansion of Israeli settlements in the occupied territories—notable words, for the audience included politicians such as the Israeli President Shimon Peres and Nir Barkat, the Mayor of Jerusalem. McEwan also personally attended a protest in Sheikh Jarrah against the expansion of Israeli settlements.

In 2013, McEwan sharply criticised Stephen Hawking for boycotting a conference in Israel as well as the boycott campaign in general, stating that there are many countries "whose governments we might loathe or disapprove of" but "Israel–Palestine has become sort of tribal and a touchstone for a certain portion of the intellectual classes. I say this in the context of thinking it is profoundly wrong of the Israeli government not to be pursuing more actively and positively and creatively a solution with the Palestinians. That's why I think one wants to go to these places to make the point. Turning away will not produce any result".

In 2009, McEwan joined the 10:10 project, a movement that supports positive action on climate change by encouraging people to reduce their carbon emissions.

In 2013, as part of a wide-ranging interview with Channel 4 News, McEwan discussed the furore that surrounded his remarks on Islamism in 2008, stating "I remember getting a lot of stick five or six years ago saying something disobliging about jihadists. There were voices, particularly on the left, that thought anyone who criticised Islamism was really criticising Islam and therefore racist. Well, those voices have gone quiet because the local atrocities committed by Islamists whether in Pakistan or Mali is so self-evidently vile". In the same interview, McEwan remarked that he felt that protestors of the 2003 Iraq War were "vindicated" by what happened subsequently; argued that the chief legacy of the Iraq War was that "[...] sometimes there are things we could do [before that war] which we no longer can" in foreign affairs; stated that at one point prior to the 2003 invasion he had hoped to be able to seek an audience with Tony Blair to persuade him not to go ahead with the war; and as someone who voted for the Liberal Democrats in the 2010 UK general election, that the current coalition government of the United Kingdom should end, stating "Let's either have a Tory government or let Ed Miliband try something different", to try and turn around a country of "great inequity". McEwan is traditionally a Labour supporter and said he had his "fingers crossed" that Miliband would become Prime Minister.

Following the referendum on the United Kingdom's membership of the European Union resulting in a win for the Leave or 'Brexit' campaign in June 2016, McEwan wrote a critical opinion article for The Guardian titled "Britain is changed utterly. Unless this summer is just a bad dream", published on 9 July 2016. In the article, McEwan wrote of consequences of the 'Brexit' vote: "Everything is changed utterly. Or about to be, as soon as your new leader is chosen. The country you live in, the parliamentary democracy that ruled it, for good or bad, has been trumped by a plebiscite of dubious purpose and unacknowledged status. From our agriculture to our science and our universities, from our law to our international relations to our commerce and trade and politics, and who and what we are in the world – all is up for a curious, unequal renegotiation with our European neighbours". McEwan's piece appeared to conclude with a sense of bewilderment and unease at how events were panning out, anticipating the ascension of Theresa May to the leadership of the Conservative Party and her appointment as Prime Minister, and noting how the previously unthinkable in British politics had actually happened. McEwan's article was published on 9 July, and May effectively won the Conservative Party leadership contest on 11 July, which precipitated her appointment as Prime Minister two days later. In May 2017, speaking at a London conference on Brexit, apparently referring to what he believed to be the older demographic of leave voters, McEwan stated that 'one and a half million oldsters freshly in their graves' would result in a putative second referendum returning a 'remain' outcome.

Personal life
McEwan has been married twice. His first marriage was to Penny Allen, an astrologer and alternative practitioner, with whom he had two sons. The marriage ended in 1995. Two years later in 1997, McEwan married Annalena McAfee, a journalist and writer who was formerly the editor of The Guardians Review section. McEwan lives in London.

In 2002, McEwan discovered that he had a brother who had been given up for adoption during the Second World War; the story became public in 2007. The brother, a bricklayer named David Sharp, was born six years earlier than McEwan, when their mother was married to a different man. Sharp has the same mother and father as McEwan but was born from an affair that occurred before they married. After her first husband was killed in combat, McEwan's mother married her lover, and Ian was born a few years later. The brothers are in regular contact and McEwan has written a foreword to Sharp's memoir.

McEwan was a long-time friend of Christopher Hitchens, the writer and polemicist.

Bibliography

Novels
The Cement Garden (1978)
The Comfort of Strangers (1981)
The Child in Time (1987)
The Innocent (1990)
Black Dogs (1992)
Enduring Love (1997)
Amsterdam (1998)
Atonement (2001)
Saturday (2005)
On Chesil Beach (2007)
Solar (2010)
Sweet Tooth (2012)
The Children Act (2014)
Nutshell (2016)
Machines Like Me (2019)
The Cockroach (2019) (novella)
Lessons (2022)

Short stories
First Love, Last Rites (1975) (Collection of short stories)
In Between the Sheets (1978) (Collection of short stories)
The Short Stories (1995) (Collection of short stories)
My Purple Scented Novel (2016 in The New Yorker;2018 as a booklet commemorating McEwan's 70th birthday)

Children's fiction
Rose Blanche (1985)
The Daydreamer (1994)

Plays
Jack Flea's Birthday Celebration (1976)
The Imitation Game (1980)

Screenplays
The Ploughman's Lunch (1983)
Soursweet (1988)
The Good Son (1993)
On Chesil Beach (2017)
The Children Act (2017)

Oratorio
Or Shall We Die? (1983)

Libretto
For You (2008)

Film adaptations
Last Day of Summer (1984)
The Cement Garden (1993)
The Comfort of Strangers (1990)
The Innocent (1993)
First Love, Last Rites (1997)
Solid Geometry (2002)
Enduring Love (2004)
Atonement (2007)
On Chesil Beach (2017)
The Children Act (2017)
The Child in Time (2017)
Sweet Tooth (in development)

Non-fiction
Science (2019)

References

Further reading
Byrnes, Christina (1995), Sex and Sexuality in Ian McEwan's Work, Nottingham, England: Pauper's Press. 
Byrnes, Christina (2002), The Work of Ian McEwan: A Psychodynamic Approach, Nottingham, England: Paupers' Press. 
Byrnes, Bernie C. (2006), Ian McEwan's 'Atonement' and 'Saturday''', Nottingham, England: Paupers' Press. 
Byrnes, Bernie C. (2008), McEwan's Only Childhood, Nottingham: Paupers' Press. 
Byrnes, Bernie C. (2009), Ian McEwan's 'On Chesil Beach': the transmutation of a secret, Nottingham: Paupers' Press.  
Childs, Peter (2005), The Fiction of Ian McEwan (Readers' Guides to Essential Criticism), Palgrave Macmillan. 
D'Eliva, Gaetano, and Christopher Williams, (1986), La Nuova Letteratura Inglese Ian McEwan, Schena Editore.
Dodou, Katherina (2009), Childhood Without Children: Ian McEwan and the Critical Study of the Child, Uppsala, Sweden: Uppsala University. 
Groes, Sebastian (2009), Ian McEwan, Continuum. 
Head, Dominic, (2007), Ian McEwan, Manchester University Press. 

The Effects of Conflict in the Novels of Ian McEwan. Jensen, Morten H. (2005)
Malcolm, David (2002), Understanding Ian McEwan, University of South Carolina. 
Möller, Swantje (2011), Coming to Terms with Crisis: Disorientation and Reorientation in the Novels of Ian McEwan, Winter. 
Pedot, Richard (1999), Perversions Textuelles dans la Fiction d'Ian McEwan, Editions l'Harmattan.
Reynolds, Margaret, and Jonathan Noakes, (2002), Ian McEwan: The Essential Guide, Vintage. 
Roberts, Ryan (2010), Conversations with Ian McEwan, University Press of Mississippi. 
Rooney, Anne (2006), Atonement, York Notes. 
Rooney, Anne (2010), Pissing in the Wind?, The New Humanist, May 2010
Ryan, Kiernan (1994), Ian McEwan (Writers and Their Work), Northcote House. 
Slay Jr., Jack (1996), Ian McEwan (Twayne's English Authors Series), Twayne Publishers. 
Williams, Christopher (1993) Ian McEwan's The Cement Garden and the Tradition of the Child/Adolescent as 'I-Narrator Biblioteca della Ricerca, Schena Editore.
Wells, Lynn, (2010) Ian McEwan'', Palgrave Macmillan.

Interviews
 Interview with McEwan. BBC Video (30 mins)
 Powells.com interview
 
 Ian McEwan interview with Charlie Rose, 1 June 2007. (Video, 26 mins)
 Salon.com interview 1998 
 "Ian McEwan, The Art of Fiction". Paris Review. Summer 2002 No. 173
Ian McEwan: On how to make love work in fiction. Filmed at Louisiana Literature festival 2013. Video interview by Louisiana Channel.
 Bookworm Interviews (Audio) with Michael Silverblatt: May 1999, July 2002, May 2005, May 2010
 Christoph Amend, Jochen Wegner: Ian McEwan, Why Do You Want to Live Forever? in: Alles Gesagt? interviewpodcast from Zeit Online from December 2019

External links 

 
 Official blog

1948 births
20th-century British short story writers
20th-century English novelists
21st-century British short story writers
21st-century English novelists
Academics of University College London
Alumni of the University of East Anglia
Alumni of the University of Sussex
Booker Prize winners
British expatriates in Germany
English expatriates in Libya
Commanders of the Order of the British Empire
Costa Book Award winners
English atheist writers
English atheists
English expatriates in Germany
English expatriates in Singapore
English humanists
English male novelists
English male screenwriters
English male short story writers
English short story writers
English people of Scottish descent
Fellows of the American Academy of Arts and Sciences
Fellows of the Royal Society of Literature
James Tait Black Memorial Prize recipients
Jerusalem Prize recipients
Living people
Writers from Aldershot
Prix Femina Étranger winners